John Banks Elliott (9 February 1917 – 18 July 2018) was a Ghanaian diplomat and statesman.  He was Ghana's first Ambassador Extraordinary and Plenipotentiary to the Soviet Union, serving from 1960 to 1966.

Early life
 
Born in 1917 to Gerald Barton Elliott a Lawyer and Auctioneer at large and Mary Wood-Elliott a Sacristan, he was named after his grandfather who came to the Gold Coast as a timber merchant with attention to detail, one of his passions was photography, J. Banks Elliott's photographs of Gold Coast showing trading stations, factories, towns, markets and people taken in 1880-1890 is archived at the Bodleian Library of Commonwealth and African Studies, Rhodes House, Oxford.

Career
During his tenure, he was Dean of the Diplomatic Corps, Head Commonwealth Ambassadors, Head African and Asian Diplomats, Head African Ambassadors Group. His appointment as Ambassador designate to the USSR was announced in Moscow on 8 January 1960 and commented on, in the Central Intelligence Agency bulletin of 12 January 1960. 

His accreditation to the Soviet Union was directed by the last Governor-General of the Dominion of Ghana, the Earl of Listowel, William Francis Hare under the direction of Queen Elizabeth II. Ambassador John Banks Elliott presented his first credentials to the then Chairman of the Presidium of the Supreme Soviet K.E. Voroshilov. On 1 July 1960, Ghana became an independent Republic within the Commonwealth, and the first President of the Republic of Ghana Kwame Nkrumah reaccredited his appointment, which he presented to the Chairman of the Presidium of the Supreme Council Leonid Brezhnev. Elliott turned 100 on 9 February 2017.

Personal life
In 1950, his daughter Alice Ivy Elliott was born in Ghana. She was a ballet teacher and choreographer.

See also
 John Aglionby (bishop)

References

External links
(two volumes reference number GB 162 MSS.Afr.s.1956) http://www.bodley.ox.ac.uk/dept/scwmss/wmss/online/blcas/elliott-jb.html
http://www.britishpathe.com/video/nkrumah-sees-moscow
Newsreel Daily News/A Chronicle of the day January 1961 No.28, fragment 2 Moscow, President Kwame Nkrumah visit to Brezhnev, Khrushchev in the Kremlin http://www.net-film.ru/en/film-11021/?search=p13%7cv2%7cs1
Newsreel Daily News/A Chronicle of the day January 1962 No.3, fragment 2. Visit of First Deputy Chairman of the USSR Mikoyan in Accra, Ghana. http://www.net-film.ru/en/film-11117/?search=q1962%7cv2%7cs1
Newsreel Daily News A Chronicle of the day 1960 № 33, fragment 1 Nikita Khrushchev in the Crimea with governmental delegation of the Republic of Ghana. http://www.net-film.ru/en/film-10914/?search=p8%7cv2%7cs1
Mr. Khrushchev in Jovial, Joke-Cracking Mood Moscow June 7, 1961, The Age, Melbourne. 8 June 1961, page 3 https://news.google.com/newspapers?id=dKQRAAAAIBAJ&sjid=vecDAAAAIBAJ&pg=5601%2C1078526
Reuters ref. 5511/61 Moscow 26 July 1961 http://www.itnsource.com/shotlist//RTV/1961/07/27/BGY504090272/?s=*
African tightrope: my two years as Nkrumah's Chief of Staff. By H.T. Alexander.  Chapter 4. The Congo situation. Page 38. Pall Mall Press, London, 1965 https://books.google.com/books?id=04lyAAAAMAAJ&focus=searchwithinvolume&q=Ghanaian+ambassador+in+Moscow
Soviet Officials, Families begin exodus from Ghana by plane. Page 3. Section five. Column 3. Eugene Register-Guard - Google News Archive Search https://news.google.com/newspapers?id=RigRAAAAIBAJ&sjid=NOEDAAAAIBAJ&pg=5211%2C96028
Ambassador Elliott received a congratulatory message from the Russian Ambassador to the United Kingdom Dr Alexander Yakovenko http://www.rusemb.org.uk/fnapr/5970
http://www.rusemb.org.uk/data/img/press/5970_1b.jpg
Ambassador John Banks Elliott signs for the Government of the Republic of Ghana. Treaty banning nuclear weapon tests in the atmosphere, in outer space and under water. Signed in Moscow on 5 August 1963. No 6964: page 50 https://treaties.un.org/doc/Publication/UNTS/Volume%20480/volume-480-I-6964-English.pdf

2018 deaths
1917 births
Akan people
Ambassadors of Ghana to Russia
Men centenarians
Ghanaian centenarians